Despina Zapounidou (born 5 October 1985 in Thessaloniki) is a Greek race walker. She competed in the 20 kilometres event at the 2008 Summer Olympics and the 2012 Summer Olympics. She holds two Greek records: 1:37:40.59 hours for the 20,000 m track walk and 12:35.16 minutes for the 3000 m indoor walk.

As a junior athlete, she was 12th in the 10,000 m track walk at the 2004 World Junior Championships in Athletics and fifth in the 10 km road walk at the 2004 IAAF World Race Walking Cup. She entered the senior 20 km event at the 2006 and 2008 Race Walking Cup but failed to finish on both occasions. She also failed to finish at the 2005 Universiade and the 2013 European Race Walking Cup.

Competition record

References

External links

1985 births
Living people
Athletes from Thessaloniki
Greek female racewalkers
Olympic athletes of Greece
Athletes (track and field) at the 2008 Summer Olympics
Athletes (track and field) at the 2012 Summer Olympics